Lyndel Soon   born in 1978 in Penang, Malaysia, won the title of Miss Malaysia Tourism 2001.  She was also the winner of Miss Cosmopolitan International 2001; as well as the 4th runner up in Miss Tourism International 2001. She is a Malaysian Chinese who is currently residing in the United States.

Early life
Lyndel Soon was born in Penang, Malaysia, the younger in a family of two children. Her father is surgeon and her mother, is a housewife. She attended INTI University College, Laureate International Universities (INTI-UC) and went on to study Hospitality & Tourism Management in Purdue University, West Lafayette, Indiana, U.S. She worked briefly with the Ritz-Carlton hotel (San Francisco, California) and then went on to pursue her interest in the holistic field. She studied in Las Vegas School of Colon Hydrotherapy (Nevada) and became an I-ACT Colon Hydrotherapist, and later continued her studies in Complementary Health and Nutrition with Global College of Natural Medicine.

Pageantry & Film
While Lyndel was studying Certificate of Marketing (CIM) in Sunway College, she was nominated by her teacher to join Miss CIM pageant within her college department and won Miss CIM 1996. During the same period, she also was selected by the principal of Sunway College, as one of the eight "most outstanding all rounder student in CIM 1996" and was later interviewed by a Malay Teenage magazine called REMAJA. However, Lyndel's rise to pageantry took place during an internship with the principal of Stardust Productions - a modeling agency. She was asked to fill in the state-level position as a favor, due to a fact that a delegate of (Kedah state, Malaysia) had quit 2 weeks before the Miss Malaysia Tourism pageant. As fate has it, Lyndel went on to compete in the Miss Malaysia Tourism pageant where she brought home the crown as Miss Malaysia Tourism 2001 along with the title of Miss Photogenic, and became the Cover Girl for HER WORLD Malaysia magazine all in the same year. She went on to the world level and became the 4th runner up in Miss Tourism International; as well as the title of Miss Cosmopolitan International 2001.

Lyndel played a lead role in a SAG Independent  short film titled Savasana (2010- thriller, drama) which she co-starred with other actors including Maria Skorobogatov who starred as young Clarice Starling in The Silence of the Lamb (1991) and Julie Ow - a Hawaiian television actress who starred in several television shows including L.A. Law, Melrose Place, and Lost. Lyndel will also be playing the lead in a feature film titled "Pachinko" (crime) which is scheduled to shoot in 2013.

Filmography

References

External links

Malaysian people of Chinese descent
1978 births
People from Penang
Living people
Malaysian actresses
Miss Tourism International delegates
Malaysian beauty pageant winners